A Muppets Christmas: Letters to Santa is a 2008 NBC television special directed by Kirk R. Thatcher featuring The Muppets in a Christmas mission to personally deliver three letters to Santa Claus, accidentally diverted by Gonzo, to the North Pole. The special, shot in Brooklyn and Midtown Manhattan, was released by Walt Disney Studios Home Entertainment on DVD.

Plot
On Christmas Eve in New York City, the Muppets go to the post office to deliver each of their letters to Santa Claus with Mayor Michael Bloomberg denying Miss Piggy's offer to move the line along as people in New York should be polite. The Muppets deliver their letters as Gonzo accidentally speeds up the letter conveyor belt as a postal worker (Jesse L. Martin) has the Muppets delivered back to their apartment building.

When they head back to their apartment, Gonzo discovers that three letters wound up in his coat from a mishap there. One of those letters he recognizes as being written by his friend, a neighbor girl named Claire (Madison Pettis). With the post office closed early and Sam Eagle warning Gonzo and Fozzie Bear about the pitfalls of opening someone else's mail, the Muppets try different attempts like a pigeon delivery service and the enlistment of two Mafia members (Steve Schirripa and Tony Sirico). On Gonzo's insistence, the principal Muppets decide to go to the North Pole and deliver them personally. They get there in a taxi while scavenging money to pay the taxicab driver (Whoopi Goldberg)

The Muppets end up getting tickets from a North Pole Airlines clerk named Joy (Uma Thurman) and getting caught by a bitter security guard Officer Frank Meany (Nathan Lane) who, for being a bully in his youth, perpetually ended up on Santa's naughty list. It's also because of his appearance that people often fear him. He and Bobo the Bear allow the Muppets to pass through.

They eventually reach the North Pole, only to find out from the Chief Christmas Elf (Paul Williams) that Santa has already left to deliver the presents. The real Santa (Richard Griffiths) overhears their grieving and returns.

While on a sleigh ride after being helped by Joy, they hand him Claire's letter and the other two which are revealed to have come from Pepe the King Prawn and Frank Meany. Pepe wanted to become an expert opera singer which Santa grants. Frank wanted to be taken off the naughty list. Santa grants this wish enabling Frank to finally get that red tricycle he wanted as it appears before him and Bobo.

Santa brings them home to New York in time to spend the rest of the holiday with Claire and her mom (Jane Krakowski), which was all Claire wanted in the first place. All the Muppets show up after cancelling their vacations where they celebrate Christmas with Claire and her mom as they decorate her apartment.

Cast
 Madison Pettis - Claire
 Jane Krakowski - Claire's Mom
 Richard Griffiths - Santa Claus
 Nathan Lane - Officer Frank Meany
 Uma Thurman - Joy

Muppet performers

 Steve Whitmire - Kermit the Frog, Rizzo the Rat (most scenes), Beaker, Statler
 Dave Goelz - Gonzo the Great, Dr. Bunsen Honeydew, Zoot, Waldorf, Beauregard
 Bill Barretta - Pepe the King Prawn, Bobo the Bear, Rowlf the Dog, Swedish Chef, Dr. Teeth, Pigeon Dad
 Eric Jacobson - Fozzie Bear, Miss Piggy, Animal, Sam the Eagle
 David Rudman - Scooter, Janice 
 Matt Vogel - Floyd Pepper, Camilla the Chicken, Lew Zealand, Crazy Harry, Robin the Frog, Pigeon Son
 Noel MacNeal - Sweetums
 Tyler Bunch - Pigeon Mom, Rizzo the Rat (one scene)
 Leslie Carrara-Rudolph - Penguin
 Martin P. Robinson - Penguin

Additional Muppets performed by Pam Arciero, Heather Asch, Kevin Clash, Stephanie D'Abruzzo, Alice Dinnean, James Godwin, John Kennedy, Jim Kroupa, Tim Lagasse, Peter Linz, Jim Martin, and Paul McGinnis

Cameo guest stars
 Mayor Michael Bloomberg - Himself
 Whoopi Goldberg - Cab Driver
 Jesse L. Martin - Postal Worker
 Petra Němcová - Beaker's Girlfriend
 Steve Schirripa - Mafia Guy
 Tony Sirico - Mafia Guy
 Paul Williams - Chief Christmas Elf

Music

This is the fourth time that songwriter Paul Williams has contributed songs to the Muppets. A version of "Santa Claus Is Coming to Town" by The Crystals was also used during the opening credits but was not available on the soundtrack itself.

Soundtrack

See also
 List of Christmas films

References

External links
 
 
 

2008 television specials
American musical comedy films
American television films
American Christmas films
The Muppets films
Films directed by Kirk Thatcher
The Muppets television specials
Christmas television specials
NBC television specials
Santa Claus in film
Santa Claus in television
2000s Christmas films
American Christmas comedy films
American Christmas television specials
2000s English-language films
2000s American films